Transcription factor SOX-5 is a protein that in humans is encoded by the SOX5 gene.

Function 

This gene encodes a member of the SOX (SRY-related HMG-box) family of transcription factors involved in the regulation of embryonic development and in the determination of the cell fate. The encoded protein may act as a transcriptional regulator after forming a protein complex with other proteins. The encoded protein may play a role in chondrogenesis. A pseudogene of this gene is located on chromosome 8. Multiple transcript variants encoding distinct isoforms have been identified for this gene.

Mutations in the SOX5 gene can cause Lamb-Shaffer syndrome.

See also 
 SOX genes

References

Further reading 

 
 
 
 
 
 
 
 
 
 
 
 
 

Transcription factors